The Bill Murray Stories: Life Lessons Learned from a Mythical Man is a 2018 American documentary film written, edited and directed by Tommy Avallone.

Plot
The film explores and investigates several "urban legends" surrounding American actor and comedian Bill Murray.

Cast
 Tommy Avallone as himself
 John Barnhardt as himself
 Christopher Beaumont as himself

Release

Reception
The review aggregator website Rotten Tomatoes reported  approval rating based on  reviews. Peter Howell from the Canadian daily newspaper Toronto Star gave the film 3 out of 4 stars, stating: "The Bill Murray Stories: Life Lessons Learned From a Mythical Man addresses the very real title star’s amusingly bizarre habit of casually barging into regular lives." Richard Roeper writing for the Chicago Sun-Times gave "The Bill Murray Stories" 3.5 out of 4 stars. John DeFore from The Hollywood Reporter liked the movie but called it "an enjoyable but hardly essential pop-culture exploration".

References

External links
 
 

Documentary films about actors
2010s English-language films
Bill Murray